Bavariscyllium is an extinct genus of catshark from the Jurassic period. Its name is derived from the German state of Bavaria, in which it was found, and a Greek mythological sea monster, Scylla. It is known by a singular species B. tischlingeri from the lower Tithonian of Germany, which is known only from the holotype specimen. While the stratigraphy is known, the exact locale is not. The species was named for the person who donated it, Mr. Helmut Tischlinger.

References

Scyliorhinidae
Jurassic fish of Europe
Prehistoric cartilaginous fish genera